Footville is an unincorporated community in southwestern Trumbull Township, Ashtabula County, Ohio, United States. Spring and Trumbull Creeks, which are both tributaries of the Grand River, pass near Footville.

Community
Footville is named for an early settler, Loren Foote, who donated land for a school and church in the community.  For a time, a post office (now closed) was operated in Footville.  A cemetery is located in the northeastern corner of the community.  Its school, originally constructed in 1842, ceased operating when it consolidated with the Geneva school system; however, the building remains and is used for community events. A small park, which contains a playground and a memorial to veterans, is also located in the community.

References

Unincorporated communities in Ashtabula County, Ohio
Unincorporated communities in Ohio